Mind control has proven a popular subject in fiction, featuring in books and films such as The Manchurian Candidate (1959; film adaptation 1962) and The IPCRESS File (1962; film 1965), both stories advancing the premise that controllers could hypnotize a person into murdering on command while retaining no memory of the killing. As a narrative device, mind control serves as a convenient means of introducing changes in the behavior of characters, and is used as a device for raising tension and audience uncertainty in the contexts of the Cold War and terrorism.  Mind control has often been an important theme in science fiction and fantasy stories.  Terry O'Brien comments:  "Mind control is such a powerful image that if hypnotism did not exist,  then something similar would have to have been invented: the plot device is too useful for any writer to ignore.   The fear of mind control is equally as powerful an image."

Speculative fiction
 In Dragon Ball, Broly is mind-controlled by his father Paragus.
 In Warhammer 40,000, the T'au Empire is mind-controlling its population.
 Imperio, one of the three Unforgivable Curses in Harry Potter, is a spell used for mind control.
 In RoboCop, the titular character is mind-controlled by Raymond Sellars.
 In Gamer, death-row prisoners are mind-controlled by gamers in Slayers, a first-person shooter.
 In DC Comics, Brainiac and Poison Ivy are frequently using mind control, an ability that Darkseid also plans to obtain by seeking the Anti-Life Equation.
 In Danny Phantom, Vlad Plasmius used mind control to become a billionaire.
 In Yu-Gi-Oh!, Shadi has the Millenium Key, one of the seven Millenium Items, which provides its owner with the mind control ability.
 In the movie series Men in Black, a device used for memory erasing (known as the Neuralyzer) is used frequently by Agents Kay and Jay.
 In the television series Doctor Who, there are multiple stories involving mind control.
The Master is able to control the minds of individuals with a weak will by looking into their eyes, a form of hypnosis.  In "The Sound of Drums", he is able to do this on a massive scale through the Archangel satellite network, but this backfires when the Doctor manages to use the network to defeat him.
In "Rise of the Cybermen" and "The Age of Steel", EarPods are devices that can place the user into a trance-state and download information directly into their brain, as well as other features, such as communication. EarPods are widely used in a parallel universe, worn in both ears. Unbeknownst to the users, the EarPods could also mind control as the population's EarPods were activated and controlled them to walk to a conversion factory and be converted into Cybermen.
A similar method of control by the Cybermen reappears in "Army of Ghosts". Workers at the Torchwood Institute wore a communication earpiece. As some workers were captured by the Cybermen, their earpieces were manipulated to control them with the worker reemerging with an earpiece in each ear. It was later found that the earpieces were connected to the brain through artificial tissue.
 In the Anthony Burgess novel A Clockwork Orange, later adapted into a film by Stanley Kubrick, the "Ludovico Technique" is a form of mind control that causes the subject, in this case the thug anti-hero Alex, to feel sickness and pain whenever he has a violent or anti-social impulse. This backfires because of Alex's association with the music of Ludwig van Beethoven to ultraviolence, an unintended side effect means that he has the same physical reaction to the music alone, which is exploited later by a man whose wife Alex had raped.
 In Philip K. Dick's 1968 novel Do Androids Dream of Electric Sheep?, a device called a Penfield Mood Organ is used to control mood.
 Mind control (telepathic hypnosis) is a prominent psionic gift in the Scanners series of films. It is used by the Scanners to escape imprisonment in the first film, and to sometimes control others in the subsequent films.
 George Orwell's novel Nineteen Eighty-Four features a description of mind control, both directly by torture, and indirectly, in the form of pervasive mind control by the use of Newspeak, a constructed language designed to remove the possibility, Sapir-Whorf-wise of articulating or of even thinking subversive thoughts.
 The Jedi mind trick is a prominent plot device in the Star Wars saga.
 In The Matrix, a chemical was injected into Morpheus to make him reveal access codes.
 In Michael Crichton's novel The Terminal Man, the Terminal Man has doctors implant a simple computer into the brainstem of a man who suffers from impulsive violence. The plan is to stimulate certain nerves to ease the violent impulses. Instead, the violence becomes even more irresistible.
 In the anime, movie and video game series Street Fighter 2, the main villain, known as M. Bison uses his "Psycho Power" to brainwash and corrupt street fighters across the world into joining his criminal organization known as Shadowloo, turning them into remorseless killing machines fully under his control.
 In the X-Men comic book series, Professor Xavier, can read and control people's minds. Mind control and other psychic abilities are relatively common mutations in the X-Men universe; other people with this ability include Emma Frost and, to a lesser degree, Jean Grey.
 The House of the Scorpion is a science fiction book in which people have computer chips implanted in their brain, allowing them to only do what they are 'programmed' to do. These people are referred to as 'Eejits'.
 In the anime series, Code Geass, the protagonist, Lelouch Lamperouge, gets the ability, Geass, which gives him a form of mind control by allowing him to give someone an absolute order, by looking them in the eye.
 In the film Control Factor, an unsuspecting "everyman" slowly realizes he is an unwitting guinea pig being used in a mind control test. If successful, the test will then expand to behavioral control of an entire population.
 In the Resident Evil films, based on the video game series of the same name, the fictional Umbrella Corporation captures and brainwashes the protagonist, Alice (portrayed by Milla Jovovich), as part of their "Program: Alice" experiment.
 In the Bionicle storyline, a Kanohi mask called Komau allows the user the power to control minds of beings.
 In John Christopher's Tripods trilogy, the alien Masters control all of humanity via devices called Caps which are permanently affixed to the skull. The Caps received signals broadcast by equipment in the Masters' cities.
 In Empire of the Ants, giant ants used a white gas to control the minds of humans.
 In Stargate SG-1, the Goa'uld had brainwashing technology that is used several times over the show and proves both easy and difficult to defeat depending on what technique is used.
 In Stargate Universe, using presumably left-over Goa'uld technology, the Lucian Alliance are able to brainwash their enemies into becoming spies for them as they do with Colonel David Telford.  This brainwashing is difficult to break as shown with Telford: the characters were forced to evacuate the air in the room he was in, let him die for a short period of time then revive him.  Those brainwashed are shown to remember their actions as Telford remembers everything he did.
 In Star Trek: The Next Generation, there are at least three episodes featuring Mind Control:
In "The Mind's Eye",  Geordi La Forge is brainwashed into becoming an assassin by the Romulans to reignite hostilities between The Federation and the Klingon Empire.  The depiction of brainwashing in the episode relies upon feeding images and impulses directly into La Forge's cortex via his VISOR interface.
In "The Game", the crew of the Enterprise is controlled using a device that has the user playing a simple 3D game and provides direct stimulation to the pleasure centers of the brain while affecting their higher reasoning functions.  The Ktarians use this to attempt to get the crew to entice other members of Starfleet to play the game, eventually controlling the entire Federation.
In the two-part "Chain of Command" episode Captain Picard is captured and a Cardassian agent uses traditional methods of brain-washing (sensory deprivation, sensory bombardment, forced nakedness, stress positions, dehydration, starvation, physical pain, and cultural humiliation).
In the episode "Conspiracy" alien brain parasites have taken control of key Starfleet officers in an attempt to take over that organization.
 In the South Korean-Japanese manhwa Blade of the Phantom Master and the film based on it, the character Chun Hyang (later called Sando) is brainwashed into becoming the bodyguard of a corrupt lord, but she is later freed by the main character Munsu.
 In the Japanese fantasy light novel series Redo of Healer and the anime based on it, the anti-hero Keyarga uses his powers to brainwash Flare, the corrupt princess of Jioral, into becoming his companion, and later does the same to her younger sister Norn.
 In the film MirrorMask, the main character Helena is brainwashed by the Queen of Shadows into becoming her daughter. 
In Star Trek: Voyager the episode "Equinox", Seven's brain is operated on by the unethical doctor to reveal codes she refuses to give.
In the 1987 animated Teenage Mutant Ninja Turtles TV series season 3 episode "Corporate Raiders from Dimension X", Shredder kidnaps businessmen all across New York City and takes them to the Octopus Inc. headquarters, where he brainwashes them by indoctrination to carry out crimes, and kidnap more businessmen.
In the first season of the Netflix original series Jessica Jones, main antagonist Kilgrave—known in comics as Purple Man—has the ability to compel people to obey his orders. He uses this power to force protagonist Jessica into an abusive relationship. Within the series' context, Kilgrave's mind control is an allegory for manipulative and abusive behavior. Jessica's enhanced strength and her resistance to Kilgrave's abilities, on the other hand, embody free will and women's empowerment.
 Several Batman villains have the power of hypnosis; examples include the Mad Hatter, who relies on various technological devices to brainwash individuals, and Poison Ivy, who uses pheromones, plant-based creations, and occasionally supernatural means to take control of others, especially men.
 In The Unlisted, the "Global Child Initiative Programme", led by the Infinity Group with government support, secretly implants schoolchildren with mind control devices through a mandatory dental plan. As a result of the implant, the children develop enhanced physical and cognitive abilities, with the implant "updating" their brains with new knowledge and fluency in foreign languages such as Mandarin and Hindi. The end goal of Infinity Group is to expand the GCIP worldwide and make the mind control complete and permanent, to create and entire generation of obedient and compliant workers. Children who managed to avoid the implantation form a resistance group called the Unlisted, but are actively hunted by Infinity Group.
In the 2021 film Girl Next, a woman is abducted, drugged, and taken to a secluded Texas ranch, where young women are tortured and brainwashed into becoming obedient, living sex dolls, that are then sold into the sex trade.
In the 2022 TV series Severance, a medical procedure is applied to employees to separate non-work memories from work memories.

Video games
In the critically acclaimed DC Comics video game Batman: Arkham City, highly trained mercenaries loyal to a rogue private military firm, Tyger Security, have been systematically programmed (through a combination of psychoactive drugs and posthypnotic manipulation) to blindly hate the protagonist and answer only to their employer, the ruthless Hugo Strange. Following Strange's death late in the game's storyline these effects seem to have been broken, as Tyger units promptly cease following current orders and withdraw quietly from the scene.
In BioShock, the player's character, Jack, is revealed to have been subconsciously mind-controlled and must obey any action stated after the command phrase, "Would you Kindly?".
In Call of Duty: Black Ops, the protagonist, Alex Mason, is being interrogated by his own CIA colleagues following his brainwashing into a sleeper agent while imprisoned in the Vorkuta Gulag. The plot revolves around retracing events prior to the interrogation in an attempt to discover the purpose of the psychological manipulation Mason was subjected to. At the end of the game, it is strongly implied that Mason was responsible for John F Kennedy's assassination. In the game's sequel, Mason is shown to struggle with the lasting effects of his brainwashing.
In the MMORPG City of Heroes, players of the Controller class can opt for the primary list of powers dubbed Mind Control, which includes the ability to affect emotions remotely, confuse, inhibit or affect physical actions, and cause psionic damage to opponents.
The character Yuri in Command & Conquer: Red Alert 2 is an extremely advanced telepath with the capability of completely controlling the actions of others. There is one flaw, however: a mind-controlled person can be seen to be showing strain against Yuri's power, culminating in sweating, stammering and memory loss. Later, in the game expansion Yuri's Revenge, he leads an entire faction with several mind controlling units included. His "psychic dominators" also possess the ability to permanently mind control units.
In Crash Bandicoot series, Doctor Neo Cortex, Crash's nemesis, wants to control the mutant minds with the Cortex Vortex to conquer the world.
In the Danganronpa series, the main antagonist, Junko Enoshima, brainwashes multiple people into committing acts of despair, for example brainwashing the 77th Class of Hope's Peak Academy and converting them into Ultimate Despair.
In the series Destroy All Humans!, the main character, Cryptosporidium, can use mind control to force humans to do his bidding.
In Dreamfall: The Longest Journey, the mysterious Project Alchera is revealed to be a form of mind-control, marketed to the masses as a form of entertainment.
In Final Fantasy IV, the playable character Kain is mind controlled by Golbez to act as his lieutenant to seize crystals around the earth.  Later, it is revealed that Golbez himself was controlled by Zemus.
In Final Fantasy VI, the game begins with the half-human, half-esper Terra controlled by the imperial general Kefka using a slave crown.  The control is broken once the slave crown is removed.
In Heroes of the Storm, the playable hero Sylvanas has access to Mind Control, as one of her two heroic abilities.
In Lego Batman, some of the playable villain characters can use a power called mind control, which allows them to take control of an enemy to open doors or reach inaccessible areas.
In the Mass Effect series the primary antagonists, the Reapers, use a form of mind control called "indoctrination" to manipulate people into becoming willing servants and thralls.
In Metal Gear Solid, Psycho Mantis, a rogue special forces member with powerful telepathic abilities, subtly controls a small army, and on several occasions completely dominates a single person's movements and speech.
 In Psi-Ops: The Mindgate Conspiracy, the player's character, Nick Scryer can perform mind control.
In Resident Evil 4, the enemies are civilians mind-controlled through the use of parasites known as "Las Plagas"; in Resident Evil 5, the main antagonist, Albert Wesker, uses a special drug to brainwash a recurring protagonist, Jill Valentine.
In Sonic Pinball Party, Doctor Eggman, Sonic's nemesis, turns all the people into robots, kidnaps Sonic's assistant Miles "Tails" Prower and Sonic's love interest Amy Rose, ties them up to a chair, puts them on a device and brainwashes them.
In the MMORPG Star Wars: The Old Republic, players that choose a force user class can occasionally force persuade a NPC during conversations, which sometimes allow the player to manipulate the actions and decisions of NPCs. This ability may change the outcome and situation of the dialogue.
The Dark Archon, a unit in the computer game StarCraft, has the ability to psionically mind control other units, indefinitely taking complete control of them.
In Super Mario Odyssey, Mario can throw Cappy on enemies or other objects to temporally control them.
In Super Paper Mario, the character Nastasia has the ability to brainwash people by looking them in the eyes, this is the way she brainwashes Luigi as well as Bowser's Goomba and Koopa army, although Luigi is later freed from her brainwashing by Dimentio.
In the MMORPG World of Warcraft, players of the priest class gain the ability to mind-control other humanoid characters, gaining full control over their actions for a short period. (Due to interface limitations, priests cannot do anything else while controlling a target.)
In the X-COM series, mind control is a possible ability certain aliens or soldiers are able to employ against each other in the game.
In Far Cry 5, two of the game's antagonists use mind control. Jacob Seed uses the song "Only You" by The Platters to brainwash the player, while Faith Seed uses a hallucogenic drug called Bliss.
In The Stanley Parable if the player follows the Narrators instructions exactly, Stanley will stumble upon the Mind Control Device, the device used to control Stanley and his coworkers until the events of the main game.

Other fiction

 The TV series The Prisoner featured mind control as a recurring plot element.
 In the Korean mini-series Winter Sonata the protagonist has his memory altered by a clinical psychiatrist at his mother's request which forms the crux of the plot as he struggles to overcome it.
 In the movie Conspiracy Theory, Mel Gibson plays Jerry Fletcher, a cab driver and a conspiracy theorist who accidentally hits a truth involving a secret government-funded mind control program, as it turns out Jerry himself is one of the subjects of the program.
 In Judy Malloy's Revelations of Secret Surveillance, a group of artists and writers struggle to understand and expose a covert system that utilizes psychodrama and brain scanning surveillance to interfere with the lives of artists, activists, and many other people.
 The novel Trilby (1894) features the character Svengali, who hypnotizes the novel's heroine to enhance her singing performance. The character gained popularity as the stereotype of an evil hypnotist, and became the basis for feature films throughout the 20th century.
 In Aldous Huxley's Brave New World, a technique called hypnopaedia is used to condition children to be obedient citizens.
 An adaptation of Kurt Vonnegut's "Harrison Bergeron", was made into a film Harrison Bergeron, a 1995 production. Everyone but the elite had "handicapping" devices attached to their brains.
 Mr. Big, one of the antagonists in the PBS Kids GO! series WordGirl, frequently uses mind control to entice people to buy his products.
 In “The Phoney Booths” episode of the 1960s tv series Underdog, Simon Bar Sinister uses telephone booths named “Phoney Booths” to brainwash people and put them into his power.
 Queen Chrysalis, a powerful antagonist of the Hub series My Little Pony: Friendship Is Magic, has the gift of mind control via emotional manipulation and metamorphic abilities. In "A Canterlot Wedding", she uses this ability to disguise herself as Princess Cadence and bring the princess's fiancee Shining Armor under her spell, as well as manipulating Cadence's bridesmaids to become her servants. Starlight Glimmer, another antagonist, used a combination of a magic staff and more traditional forms of mind control (including solitary confinement, denial of care, and constantly broadcasting messages via loudspeaker) to create a cult of ponies obsessed with the idea of conformity.
 In the Monkees episode "The Frodis Caper", an insane wizard captures a sentient potted plant from outer space and attempts world domination by broadcasting the plant's mind-control eye over television.
 In the American soap opera Days of Our Lives, several characters including John Black, Hope Brady, and Steve Johnson, were subjected to brainwashing and mind control by Stefano DiMera and other villains, in order to turn them into assassins and mob "soldiers".
 In the 2007 Korean supernatural horror film based on a 2005 graphic novel Someone Behind You a homicidal family curse causing the minds of family members and friends attacking and slaying one another for no apparent reason. A fearless young woman feared for her life that her family and friends are out to do the same against her. To survive the ongoing epidemic of homicidal attacks she is warned by a sinister student who cautiously reminds her never to trust family, friends, nor even herself. In 2009 it was released in the US under the new title "Voices".
 In the horror/thriller film series Candyman, Daniel Robitaille/Candyman uses mind control on a few of his main victims who denies his existence to carry out his murders supernaturally. In the 1992 film, he uses his ability to hypnotize Helen Lyle and leads her into psychosis by framing her for the gruesome murders he carried out. As with the 1999 film, he also puts his granddaughter Caroline McKeever under a trance and is framed for the crimes. In the 2021 film, he possesses Anthony McCoy as a vessel in his hallucinations to actually commit his murders through mind control.

Entertainment

Hypnotism has often been used by stage performers to induce volunteers do strange things, such as clucking like a chicken, for the entertainment of audiences. The British psychological illusionist Derren Brown performs more sophisticated mental tricks in his television programmes, Derren Brown: Mind Control.

The late Russian psychic, Wolf Messing, was said to be able to hand somebody a blank piece of paper and make them see money or whatever he wanted them to see.

See also
 Hypnosis in popular culture
 Mindwipe

References

Further reading
 

Topics in popular culture
Mind control
 
Science in popular culture